Troy High School (THS) is a public high school in Troy, Michigan, United States. It enrolls approximately 2,000 students in grades 9–12. It is one of four high schools in the Troy School District, along with Athens High School, Troy College and Career School, and International Academy East.

The school opened for the 1950–1951 school year and was originally located at 3179 Livernois (now the Troy Community Center). It moved to its current location for the 1992–1993 school year.

Troy High School was ranked 60th by Newsweek in its listing of America's Best High Schools for 2016.

Academics 

Troy High School offers Advanced Placement (AP) courses, including AP Calculus AB, AP Calculus BC, AP United States History, AP Chemistry, AP World History, AP Human Geography, AP Environmental Science, AP Biology.

Extracurricular activities

There are six Troy High bands: the Campus Band, the Cadet Band, the Concert Band, the Symphonic Band, the Troy Colt Marching Band, and the Jazz Band. The Cadet, Concert and Symphonic Bands –  together comprising the Marching Band – appeared by the Queen's invitation (through a representative of the Lord Mayor of London) at the 2007 London New Year's Day Parade. The 1974 Marching Band participated in the Orange Bowl Parade. In 2004, the Troy High Symphonic Band played at Carnegie Hall in New York City.

Troy High School has three choirs. The Concert Choir is an advanced choir that requires an audition to join. The Treble Choir is the less skilled choir that does not require an audition to join. The A Capella Choir is an after-school group that is run by students, has a limited number of members, and requires an audition to join.

There are also four Troy High School string orchestras: the Freshman Orchestra, the Concert Orchestra, the Philharmonic Orchestra, and the Symphony Orchestra. In addition to the orchestras, many string players participate with the Troy Country Fiddlers (which is largely self-directed). In 2017, the Troy High Orchestras performed at Carnegie Hall in New York City.

Troy High School's theatre organization, the Troy Theatre Ensemble, performed in 2004 at the Fringe theatre festival in Edinburgh, Scotland.

The Troy High Science Olympiad team has qualified for the national tournament four times, in 1986, 2002, 2013, and 2016.

The Troy High Quiz Bowl Team participates in Michigan Quiz Bowl.

Athletics
Troy High boys' soccer won the Michigan State Championship for Division I in 2003.  Troy High football won the Michigan State Class AA championship in 1994. The Troy High women's tennis team won the championship in 2003.
Troy High girls' soccer won the Michigan State Championship for Division I in 1994, 2003, and 2013.
Troy High boys tennis won the state championship in 2021.

Notable alumni
 Bud Acton, NBA basketball player
 Henry Akin, NBA basketball player
 Jon Berti, baseball player
 Richard "Dick" Billings, Major League Baseball player
 Sutton Foster, Tony Award-winning Broadway actress
 Ellen Hollman, actress, Spartacus
 Marcus Kennedy, basketball player
 Steve McCatty, MLB pitcher and coach
 Donna McKechnie, Broadway, film and television actress
 Ryan Stegman, artist for Marvel Comics, VENOM, Superior Spider-Man, Uncanny Avengers, SCARLET SPIDER, Inhuman and Amazing Spider-Man
 Aileen Wuornos, female serial killer and inspiration for the 2003 film Monster
 Steven Yeun, actor and comedian, most notably from The Walking Dead
 James Young, NBA player; 2019-20 top scorer in the Israel Basketball Premier League

References

External links

School website
School newspaper

Educational institutions established in 1950
Public high schools in Michigan
Schools in Troy, Michigan
High schools in Oakland County, Michigan
1950 establishments in Michigan